Raúl Alejandro Olivares Gálvez (born 17 April 1988) is a Chilean footballer who plays as a goalkeeper for the Bolivian club Universitario de Vinto.

Club career
After ending his contract with Colo-Colo, on 2015 he signed with Estudiantes de Buenos Aires, but he didn't make his debut and canceled the contract to join Bolivian club Universitario de Sucre.

On May 5, 2017, he scored the first goal of his professional career, a penalty kick against Sport Boys.

International career
He was called up to the  Chile U21 squad for the 2009 Toulon Tournament, playing the match against France U21 at the Group Stage. Chile became champion of the tournament. In addition, he was part of the Chile squad for both 2008 Toulon Tournament (U23) and 2010 Toulon Tournament (U22), but he didn't make any appearance.

On September 7, 2011, he represented Chile in a match against Mexico U22  played in Curicó, Chile. The squad only included under-25 players and was a draw by 2–2.

Honours

Club
Colo-Colo
 Chilean Primera División (2): 2006 Clausura, 2009 Clausura

Santiago Morning
 Primera B (1): 2007 Promotion Playoffs

Unión Española
 Chilean Primera División (1): 2013 Transición
 Supercopa de Chile (1): 2013

Jorge Wilstermann
 Bolivian Primera División (1): 2015–16 Clausura

International
Chile U23
 Toulon Tournament (1): 2009

References

External links
 
 Raúl Olivares at Football Lineups

1988 births
Living people
Footballers from Santiago
Chilean footballers
Chilean expatriate footballers
Chile youth international footballers
Colo-Colo footballers
Santiago Morning footballers
Unión San Felipe footballers
Deportes La Serena footballers
Unión Española footballers
Estudiantes de Buenos Aires footballers
Universitario de Sucre footballers
C.D. Jorge Wilstermann players
Cobreloa footballers
Club Always Ready players
Universitario de Vinto players
Chilean Primera División players
Segunda División Profesional de Chile players
Primera B Metropolitana players
Primera B de Chile players
Bolivian Primera División players
Expatriate footballers in Argentina
Chilean expatriate sportspeople in Argentina
Expatriate footballers in Bolivia
Chilean expatriate sportspeople in Bolivia
Association football goalkeepers